Balkány is a town in Szabolcs-Szatmár-Bereg county, in the Northern Great Plain region of eastern Hungary.

Geography
There are many small towns surrounding Balkány, including Biri, Geszteréd, Bököny, Szakoly, and Nyírmihálydi.

Climate
Balkány has nearly 2,000 hours of annual sunshine, which is the second highest after the Alföld region.

History

Balkány was first mentioned in 1214. The meaning of the name has most likely to do with swamp or wetland. The first landlords of the region were the Gut-Keled noble family who were given Balkány as a gift by the king in 1289. Balkány was then divided up by the family, the western part went to Paul (Pál) and Thomas (Tamás), the eastern part was taken by Paul's son, Lawrence (Lőrinc). As a result of attacks by the Ottoman Turks and other nomadic tribes Balkány became a ghost town until the late 16th century. In the early 18th century, the town's population rose again, governance was shared among the most prosperous families such as Bezdédy, Désy, Finta, Gencsy, Gődény, Guth, and Koczogh. In 1839, it was the largest city in the county with a population of 3,006.

Today
Balkány is home to 6,852 people (2005) most of whom live in the country. Unemployment is a serious problem: there are more jobs being lost than created. Like in the past, the biggest sector of employment is agriculture. However, the lack of investment and decreasing prices of locally produced goods have created an unfriendly business environment.

There are a number of kindergartens and two elementary as well as middle schools educating the town's 1,300 children.

International relations

Twin towns — Sister cities
Balkány is twinned with:
  Lázári, Romania
  Słopnice, Poland

References

External links

 Official Website in Hungarian
 Tourist info
 Aerial Pictures of Balkány

Populated places in Szabolcs-Szatmár-Bereg County